Abdulaziz bin Talal bin Abdulaziz Al Saud (born 1982) is a Saudi Arabian prince and businessman.

Early life
Prince Abdulaziz bin Talal was born in Riyadh on 5 September 1982. He is the fifth son of Prince Talal and Magdah bint Turki Al Sudairi, the daughter of Turki bin Khaled al Sudairi, former President of the Saudi Human Rights Commission.

Personal life
Prince Abdulaziz bin Talal is married to Princess Sora bint Saud Al Saud, co-founder of Sora by Loren Jewels, and granddaughter of former Saudi king, King Abdullah bin Abdulaziz Al Saud.

Positions and activities
Founder & President of the Global Saudi Presence Co.
Honorary President of the first WSITGC in the GCC
Member of the NCUSAR International Advisory Committee
Member of the Islamic Finance and The Global Economic Crisis Forum
Member of the Concordia Summit Leadership Council
Fmr. Chair of the Transpacific Broadcast Group
Fmr. Chair of the Arab Open University Forum
Shareholder of Island Expert PVT LTD (Maldives)

References

External links

 Official website. 

Abdulaziz
1982 births
Living people
Abdulaziz
Abdulaziz